In September 2016, the International Union for Conservation of Nature (IUCN) listed 474 endangered mammalian species. Of all evaluated mammalian species, 8.6% are listed as endangered. 
The IUCN also lists 86 mammalian subspecies as endangered.

Of the subpopulations of mammals evaluated by the IUCN, five species subpopulations have been assessed as endangered.

For a species to be considered endangered by the IUCN it must meet certain quantitative criteria which are designed to classify taxa facing "a very high risk of extinction". An even higher risk is faced by critically endangered species, which meet the quantitative criteria for endangered species. Critically endangered mammals are listed separately. There are 679 mammalian species which are endangered or critically endangered.

Additionally 783 mammalian species (14% of those evaluated) are listed as data deficient, meaning there is insufficient information for a full assessment of conservation status. As these species typically have small distributions and/or populations, they are intrinsically likely to be threatened, according to the IUCN. While the category of data deficient indicates that no assessment of extinction risk has been made for the taxa, the IUCN notes that it may be appropriate to give them "the same degree of attention as threatened taxa, at least until their status can be assessed."

This is a complete list of endangered mammalian species and subspecies evaluated by the IUCN. Species and subspecies which have endangered subpopulations (or stocks) are indicated. Where possible common names for taxa are given while links point to the scientific name used by the IUCN.

Odd-toed ungulates

Species

Subspecies

Primates

There are 121 species and 56 subspecies of primate assessed as endangered.

Gibbons

Species

Subspecies

Great apes
Species
Bonobo
Chimpanzee
Subspecies

Lemurs
There are 48 species and one subspecies of lemur assessed as endangered.

Indriids

Daubentoniidae species
Aye-aye

Sportive lemurs

Lemurids
Species

Subspecies
Gilbert's bamboo lemur

Cheirogaleids

Tarsiers
Species
Peleng tarsier
Sangihe tarsier
Subspecies
Tarsius bancanus bancanus
Belitung Island tarsier

Old World monkeys
Species

Subspecies

New World monkeys
Species

Subspecies

Lorisoidea
Species
Red slender loris
Subspecies

Cetartiodactyls
Cetartiodactyla includes dolphins, whales and even-toed ungulates. There are 40 species, 14 subspecies, and four subpopulations of cetartiodactyl assessed as endangered.

Non-cetacean even-toed ungulates
There are 33 species and ten subspecies of non-cetacean even-toed ungulate assessed as endangered.

Musk deer species

Deer species

Bovids
Species

Subspecies

Other non-cetacean even-toed ungulates
Species

Subspecies

Cetaceans
Species

Subspecies

Subpopulations

Marsupials

Carnivora
Species

Subspecies

Afrosoricida

Eulipotyphla
There are 43 species in the order Eulipotyphla assessed as endangered.

Shrews

Other Eulipotyphla species

Lagomorpha

Rodents
There are 142 species and one subspecies of rodent assessed as endangered.

Hystricomorpha

Myomorpha
There are 103 species in Myomorpha assessed as endangered.

Murids

Cricetids

Nesomyids

Spalacids
Sandy mole-rat
Big-headed mole-rat

Dipodids
Armenian birch mouse
Kazbeg birch mouse

Castorimorpha

Sciuromorpha

Species

Subspecies
Baja California rock squirrel

Bats
There are 46 bat species assessed as endangered.

Megabats

Microbats

Other mammals
Species

Subspecies
Borneo elephant
Indian elephant
Sri Lankan elephant
Florida manatee
Antillean manatee

See also 
 Lists of IUCN Red List endangered species
 List of least concern mammals
 List of near threatened mammals
 List of vulnerable mammals
 List of critically endangered mammals
 List of recently extinct mammals
 List of data deficient mammals

References 

Mammals
Endangered mammals
Endangered mammals
Mammal conservation